LSK (born Leigh Stephen Kenny, 26 July 1971 in Kent, England) is a British singer, songwriter and record producer based in Leeds, who uses a mix of reggae, punk rock and hip hop. He originated the style that has been compared to the Streets, which is mentioned in a song on his second album, Outlaw.

Biography
Prior to his solo career, Kenny was the frontman of the group Bedlam Ago Go, which was signed to Sony Soho Square and released one album, Estate Style Entertainment, in 1997.

His debut solo album was the self-titled LSK but also known as Mozaik, was released in 2003. Oulaw followed in 2003, which remains his latest solo album to-date.

LSK first collaborated with Faithless on their 2004 album, No Roots and has continued as a touring and recording musician with the group.

Kenny is the older brother of English R&B artist Rhianna.

LSK is also an artist and has designed for various clients including Faithless and Nightmares on Wax.

Discography

Albums
Solo
 LSK (2000)
 Outlaw (2003)

with Faithless
 No Roots (2004)
 To All New Arrivals (2007)
 The Dance (Faithless album) (2010)
 All Blessed (2020)

Singles
"Hate or Love" (April 2000)
"Roots (The Fruit of Many)" (August 2000)
"The Biggest Fool" (November 2000)
"Rap Starr" (June 2003)

References

External links
Official website

1971 births
Living people
English male singers
English record producers
English songwriters
Musicians from Kent
Musicians from Leeds